The 19th Weapons Squadron is a United States Air Force unit assigned to the USAF Weapons School at Nellis AFB, Nevada.

The squadron was first activated as the 19th Observation Squadron in March 1942.  The 19th originally flew antisubmarine missions during World War II, then moved to China in 1944 to begin observation missions in support of Chinese ground forces.  It later flew resupply missions to resistance forces operating behind enemy lines in French Indochina.

The squadron was redesignated the 19th Tactical Air Support Squadron, then organized in July 1963.  From 1963 through 1968 the 19th Tactical Air Support Squadron flew forward air support and observation missions over Vietnam until its mission was transferred to Osan AB, South Korea in 1972, where it provided Eighth US Army and Republic of Korea ground forces with aerial reconnaissance and close air support.

Overview
The squadron has three syllabi, the Advanced Enlisted Mission Planning Course, the Intelligence Weapons Instructor Course and the Intelligence Sensor Weapons Instructor Course, and a flight that supports mission planning for 17,000 sorties annually.

History

World War II
Activated as the 19th Observation Squadron (Light) on 5 February 1942. The squadron activated on 2 March 1942 at Miami Municipal Airport as part of the Air Force Combat Command. Five days later, it moved to Jacksonville Municipal Airport, Florida. Two days after that, it became part of Army Air Forces.  On the 29th, it became part of the 66th Observation Group.

It moved to Pope Army Airfield, North Carolina on 11 May 1942. While there, it was redesignated as the 19th Observation Squadron. On 19 October 1942, it moved to Morris Field, North Carolina. On 2 April 1943, it changed name once again, to 19th Liaison Squadron. The following day, it transferred bases to Camp Campbell, Kentucky.  On 22 June 1943, it changed airfields once more, to Aiken Army Airfield, South Carolina. On 11 August 1943, it was assigned to I Air Support Command.

It flew anti-submarine missions using A-20 Havocs, B-25 Mitchells, and O-52 Owls, while undergoing observation training at these various bases in the southeastern states. They used L-1 Vigilants, L-2 Grasshoppers, Aeronca L-3s, L-4 Grasshoppers, L-5 Sentinels, L-6 Grasshoppers, and Douglas O-46s for observation sorties. P-39 Airacobras, P-43 Lancers, and P-51 Mustangs were also in the squadron aircraft inventory.

From Aiken, the squadron shipped cross-country to Camp Anza, California, arriving on 28 March 1944. This was a transit base for the squadron, as it shipped out to Bombay (now Mumbai), India. It arrived in India on 9 April, and was attached to U.S. Army Forces, China-India-Burma. It spent an itinerant few weeks further training in India, moving through Kanchrapara and Ondal, to land in Chabua on 17 May.

It then moved onward to Kunming, China arriving on 29 May 1944. They were attached to Y Force, to begin observation missions in support of Chinese Nationalist ground forces. They supported Y Force until 8 August. Their American parent unit would be variously Fourteenth Air Force and the 69th Composite Wing.

At various times, the 19th operated detachments from Kunming, Poashan, Wenshan, Yunnanyi, Chihkiang, Kweiyang, and Liuchow. It moved bases to Chengkung on 28 March 1945. After March 1945, the squadron carried mail and passengers to American liaison personnel in South China, and the 19th flew re-supply missions to resistance forces operating behind enemy lines in French Indochina.

On 1 August, the 19th was placed under operational control of Tenth Air Force.  Shortly after the Japanese surrendered, on 18 August 1945, the 19th moved to Nanning, China. From there it returned via Calcutta, India to the U.S., where it inactivated on 1 December 1945 at Fort Lewis, Washington.

Vietnam War

The 19th TASS was the first Forward Air Control squadron assigned to the Vietnam War. It was activated on 19 June 1963 at Bien Hoa Air Base, with the aim of training Vietnamese Air Force (VNAF) pilots and observers as forward air controllers. However, the squadron would not be fully operational until 15 September 1963. The new unit faced formidable shortages in equipment. The only suitable aircraft, the Cessna O-1 Bird Dog, was no longer being manufactured; the U.S. Army held the scanty inventory of existing 0-1s. They had to be refitted before being turned over. Ground transportation was also at a premium. Jeeps were not only in short supply, but radio jeeps were driven the minimum possible for fear jarring would damage the radios. Minimal mechanical maintenance was available, and replacement parts were no longer made for the Bird Dog. Radio equipment in general was outdated and inadequate.

One of the squadron's added missions was flying support and forward air control for Project DELTA in their covert insertions into Laos. They began this secretive mission in July 1963, and carried it out until the 21st Tactical Air Support Squadron later took over the role. 19th TASS was also tasked with visual reconnaissance missions, psychological warfare, and logistics escort duties. While the 19th TASS's pilots could fly forward air control missions, a Vietnamese national had to approve any air strikes. With 44 pilots and 22 Cessna O-1 Bird Dogs, the TASS never had more than 11 Vietnamese observers posted to it.

On 2 January 1964, 19th TASS began actual training of VNAF pilots and observers. Observer training was lengthened from 14 hours to 17 weeks of instruction. By 30 June 91 Vietnamese FACs were available. On 1 July, the VNAF was supposed to assume the FAC training duty. However, U.S. Secretary of Defense Robert McNamara noted that the VNAF seemed to have made no improvement within the past year. He emphasized that the Americans should be training the Vietnamese so the latter could fight. However, the squadron's stand-down was postponed because of Vietnamese unreadiness. The Vietnamese were often overwhelmed by American technology. They slacked off, and allowed the Americans to fly the close air support missions instead. VNAF's policies did not help the situation. Trained VNAF FAC pilots were returned to flying liaison sorties instead of FAC missions.

The squadron was inactivated on 8 August 1964, with its assets turned over to the Vietnamese. When the VNAF proved unequal to taking over the disbanded squadron's responsibilities, the 19th TASS was reactivated on 21 October 1964. Not until January 1965 did six U.S. fighter pilot FACs return to resume the training. In this incarnation, the squadron's principal mission was visual reconnaissance and forward air control of fighter-bombers, although it continued to train Vietnamese pilots and observers. It was shifted to the 6251st Tactical Fighter Wing on 8 July 1965. Shortly thereafter, on 8 November 1965, it was transferred to the 505th Tactical Air Support Group. The 19th TASS began flying actual forward air control sorties out of Bien Hoa on 11 November 1965, using the call sign Sidewinder. By July 1966, the 19th was parceled out among numerous forward operating locations in III Corps and II Corps. While serving as Forward Air Controllers and/or Air Liaison Officers, they used the radio net under various call signs, most of which were names of serpents.

Beginning in 1968, the 19th TASS extended its squadron inventory to include O-2 Skymasters and OV-10 Broncos. On 15 January 1971, 19th TASS absorbed the 22nd Tactical Air Support Squadron, leaving the 22nd an unmanned unequipped paper unit.  Representative of this change, the FACs supporting the 199th Light Infantry Brigade upgraded from O-1s to OV-10s at this time.

On 15 January 1971, it absorbed the 22nd Tactical Air Support Squadron, leaving the 22nd an unmanned unequipped paper unit. The unit transferred to Phan Rang Air Base, Vietnam on 1 August 1971.  On 30 September 1971, another unit acquired the 19th's inventory. The 19th then remained a paper squadron until 15 January 1972, when it transferred to the inactive theater of South Korea, to Osan AB.

By the time the 19th TASS left Vietnam, it had earned three Presidential Unit Citations, four Air Force Outstanding Unit Awards with Combat V, the Republic of Vietnam Gallantry Cross with Palm, and numerous campaign honors for its Vietnam wartime service.

During its Vietnam service, the 19 TASS had suffered 37 USAF air crew killed in action, with another two killed in a flying accident. There were also a number of casualties among non-USAF aerial observers. Its aircraft losses over the course of the war amounted to 53 O-1 Bird Dogs, 12 O-2 Skymasters and 16 OV10 Broncos.

Korean Service
Transferred to Osan AB, South Korea, on 15 January 1972. It became part of the 314th Air Division; Colonel William Peters was placed in command. It was then reconstituted and took over the O-2 aircraft of another squadron. Its new role was support of the Eighth U.S. Army and Republic of Korea ground forces, providing close air and aerial reconnaissance support. In 1973, the 19th trained the Republic of Korea Air Force to operate a Direct Air Support Center.

On 30 September 1974, the Squadron was transferred to the 51st Composite Wing (Tactical). In 1975, the squadron converted to the OV-10A Bronco. From 1975 until 1980, 19th TASS operated the forward air control mission within the Korean tactical air control system. On 15 April 1976, Detachment 1 of the 19th was assigned to Camp Casey, South Korea, remaining there until 8 January 1980.

On 8 January 1980, the 19th TASS was forwarded to the 5th Tactical Air Control Group. In 1983, the squadron converted to the OA-37B Dragonfly twin-jet aircraft. In 1985, the 19th switched back to the OV-10. On 1 August 1989, the 19 TASS transferred to Suwon Air Base, South Korea and converted to the OA-10A aircraft. The OV-10s were either retired or transferred to the USMC.

During its time in the Republic of Korea, the 19 TASS used the call sign 'Bronco' while flying the OV-10, and 'Misty' after changing to the OA-37 and OA-10. The 19th TASS remained an active combat-ready unit flying the OA-10A aircraft until the Persian Gulf War in 1991.

The squadron was inactivated on 1 October 1993, without seeing further combat action.

Modern era
USAF Weapons School Intelligence Division was activated in 1989.  Its personnel and equipment were the en cadre for the formation of the 19th Weapons Squadron on 3 February 2003.

In 2019, the 19th added two Weapons Instructor Courses for U-2 and RQ-4 pilots. As well as an Advanced Instructor Course (AIC) for enlisted intelligence analysts.

Lineage
 Constituted as the 19th Observation Squadron (Light) on 5 February 1942
 Activated on 2 March 1942
 Redesignated: 19th Observation Squadron on 4 July 1942
 Redesignated: 19th Liaison Squadron on 2 April 1943
 Inactivated on 1 December 1945
 Redesignated 19th Tactical Air Support Squadron (Light), and activated, on 17 June 1963 (not organized)
 Organized on 8 July 1963
 Discontinued and inactivated on 8 August 1964
 Activated on 16 October 1964 (not organized)
 Organized on 21 October 1964
 Inactivated on 1 October 1993
 Redesignated 19th Weapons Squadron on 24 January 2003
 Activated on 3 February 2003

Assignments
 Air Force Combat Command, 2 March 1942
 Army Air Forces, 9 March 1942
 66th Observation Group(later 66th Reconnaissance Group), 29 March 1942
 I Air Support Command (later I Tactical Air Division), 11 August 1943
 U.S. Army Forces, China-Burma-India, April 1944
 Fourteenth Air Force. 29 May 1944 (attached to Y Force)
 69th Composite Wing, 10 June 1944 (remained attached to Y Force until 8 August 1944)
 Tenth Air Force, 1 August 1945 – 1 December 1945
 34th Tactical Group, 8 July 1963 – 8 August 1964
 34th Tactical Group, 21 October 1964
 6251st Tactical Fighter Wing, 8 July 1965 (attached to 6250th Tactical Air Support Group, Provisional, 1 August-8 November 1965)
 505th Tactical Control Group, 8 November 1965 (attached to 6253d Tactical Air Support Group, Provisional, 9 September – 8 December 1966)
 504th Tactical Air Support Group, 8 December 1966
 314th Air Division, 15 January 1972
 51st Composite Wing, 30 September 1974
 5th Tactical Air Control Group, 8 January 1980
 51st Operations Group, 1 October 1990 – 1 October 1993
 USAF Weapons School, 3 February 2003 – present

Components
 Detachment: 1 (Camp Casey, South Korea): 15 April 1976 – 8 January 1980.

Stations

 Miami Army Air Field, Florida, 2 March 1942
 Jacksonville Army Air Field, Florida, 7 March 1942
 Pope Field, North Carolina, 11 May 1942
 Morris Field, North Carolina, 19 October 1942
 Camp Campbell Army Air Field, Kentucky, 3 April 1943
 Aiken Army Air Field, South Carolina, 22 June 1943 – 26 February 1944
 Juhu Aerodrome, Bombay, India, 9 April 1944
 Kanchrapara Airfield, India, c. 15 April 1944
 Ondal Airfield, India, 29 April 1944
 Chabua Airfield, India, 17 May 1944
 Kunming Airport, China, 29 May 1944

 Chengkung Airfield, China, 28 March 1945
 Nanning Airport, China, 18 August 1945
 Calcutta Airport, India, c. October 1945 – 7 November 1945
 Fort Lewis, Wachington, 30 November 1945 – 1 December 1945
 Bien Hoa Air Base, South Vietnam, 8 July 1963 – 8 August 1964; 21 October 1964
 Bien Hoa Air Base, South Vietnam, 21 October 1964
 Phan Rang Air Base, South Vietnam, 1 August 1971
 Osan Air Base, South Korea, 15 January 1972
 Suwon Air Base, South Korea, 1 August 1989
 Osan Air Base, South Korea, 1 October 1990 – 1 October 1993
 Nellis Air Force Base, Nevada, 3 February 2003 – present

Aircraft

 A-20 Havoc, 1942–1943
 B-25 Mitchell, 1942–1943
 DB-7 Boston, 1942–1943
 L-1 Vigilant, 1942–1943, 1944–1945
 L-4 Grasshopper, 1942–1943, 1943–1944
 Douglas O-46, 1942–1943
 O-52 Owl, 1942
 P-39 Airacobra, 1942–1943
 P-43 Lancer, 1942–1943
 L-2 Grasshopper, 1943, 1943–1944

 L-3 Grasshopper, 1943
 L-5 Sentinel, 1943, 1943–1945
 L-6 Grasshopper, 1943; 1943–1944
 P-51 Mustang, 1943
 O-1 Bird Dog, 1963–1964, 1964–1970, 1971
 O-2 Skymaster, 1968–1971, 1972–1975
 OV-10 Bronco, 1968–1971, 1975–1983, 1985-c. 1989
 OA-37 Dragonfly, 1983–1985
 A(later OA)-10 Thunderbolt II, 1989–1993

See also

20th Attack Squadron
22nd Attack Squadron
23rd Flying Training Squadron
25th Air Support Operations Squadron
137th Airlift Squadron
Air Education and Training Command Studies and Analysis Squadron
Raven Forward Air Controllers
54 Squadron ISR Warfare School UK Royal Air Force equivalent, delivering the QWI ISR course.

References

Notes

Bibliography

 Hobson, Chris (2001). Vietnam Air Losses: United States Air Force, Navy and Marine Corps Fixed-Wing Aircraft Losses in Southeast Asia 1961–1973. Midland Publications. , 9781857801156.
 
 
 Rowley, Ralph A. (1972). The Air Force in Southeast Asia: US FAC Operations in Southeast Asia 1961–1965. Office of Air Force History. (2011 reprint). Military Studies Press. ISBNs 1780399987, 9781780399980.

Weapons 0019